Andrea Eva Libman (born July 19, 1984) is a Canadian actress whose most popular on-screen appearances are in Little Women, Andre, and a guest role on The X-Files. She is also known for providing voice acting in various animated shows, most notably her worldwide recognition for voicing the characters of Pinkie Pie and Fluttershy in My Little Pony: Friendship Is Magic and its spinoffs.

Career
Her best-known voice roles include Dragon Ball, Madeline (taking the role of the title character from Tracey Lee Smyth in 1995 and holding on to it until My Fair Madeline in 2002, whereupon the role was passed on to Chantal Strand), the season three version of X-23 in X-Men: Evolution, young AndrAIa in ReBoot, Emmy in the PBS Kids children's animated series Dragon Tales and Isabelle in Finley the Fire Engine. Libman has voiced Pinkie Pie and Fluttershy in My Little Pony: Friendship is Magic; Cylindria in Pac-Man and the Ghostly Adventures; and Maya in Maya the Bee. She has found a large following of fans in the bronies, the teenage and adult fans of My Little Pony: Friendship is Magic.

She has appeared on camera in films and television shows including Highlander: The Series, Susie Q, The Lotus Eaters, and Lyddie.

Personal life
She stated on Twitter that although it is not her native language, she learned to read in French before English. As a musician, Libman plays the piano and is also a piano instructor. She owns a Golden Retriever named Mindy, according to her Instagram account. Libman is allergic to cats. She has a Bachelor of Applied Science in Civil engineering from the University of British Columbia.

Filmography

Live-action
 A Brony Tale – Herself (cameo)
 Bronies: The Extremely Unexpected Adult Fans of My Little Pony – Fluttershy (Archive Sound)
 #TweetIt: Featuring My Little Pony Staff and Bronies – Herself/Music Video
 Little Women – Kitty Kirk
 Andre – Mary May
 The X-Files episode "Born Again" – Michelle Bishop
 Highlander: The Series – Belinda
 Susie Q – Teri Sands
 The Lotus Eaters (1993) – Jo Spittle
 The 6th Day (2000) – Voice of SimPal Cindy
 Lyddie – Rachel Worthen

Animation
 16 Hudson – Lili
 The Adventures of Corduroy – Lisa
 Animated Classic Showcase – Various characters
 Animal Behaviour – Cheryl
 Barbie: A Fashion Fairytale – Glimmer
 Barbie Fairytopia: Mermaidia – Sea Butterfly
 Barbie and the Magic of Pegasus – Lilac
 Barbie Fairytopia: Magic of the Rainbow – Shimmer, Pixie 2
 Barbie in A Mermaid Tale – Dee
 Barbie and the Secret Door – Nola
 The Barefoot Bandits – Riley (Canadian dub, speaking season 1-3, mostly singing (season 1)
 Being Ian – Additional voices
 Billy the Cat – Additional Voices
 Bob the Builder (US Voice) – Additional Voices
 Care Bears: Adventures in Care-a-Lot – Harmony Bear
 Chip and Potato – Potato
 A Christmas Adventure ...From a Book Called Wisely's Tales – Natalie
 Dino Babies – LaBrea
 Dinosaur Baby Holy Heroes – Kaia Moreau
 Dinosaur Train – Pamela Pachycephalosaurus
 Dora the Explorer – Glowy Star
 Dragon Tales – Emmy, Forest Bird (Ep “The Forest of Darkness”) 
 DuckTales – Bramble
 Extreme Dinosaurs – Additional Voices
 Fat Dog Mendoza – Mavis Rambunctious
 Finley the Fire Engine – Isabelle the ice cream van
 George of the Jungle
 G.I. Joe Extreme – Additional Voices
 Heidi – Aunt Dete
 Helen Crawford – Cindy Chang (2004)
 Hurricanes – Additional Voices
 Johnny Test – Additional Voices
 Kelly Dream Club – Ruby
 Kate and Mim-Mim – Narrator
 Krypto the Superdog
 Lapitch the Little Shoemaker – Lisa
 LeapFrog – Lily (2002 and 2003)
 Leo the Lion: King of the Jungle (direct-to-video) – Tooey the lion cub
 Little Red Riding Hood – Little Red Riding Hood
 Little Witch – Little Witch
 Littlest Pet Shop – Additional Voices
 Madeline – Madeline
 Madeline: Lost in Paris – Madeline
 Mary-Kate and Ashley in Action!
 Maya the Bee – Maya
 Monster Buster Club – Cathy
 My Little Pony (direct-to-video animated specials) – Sweetie Belle, Zipzee
 My Little Pony: Friendship Is Magic – Pinkie Pie, Fluttershy, Additional Voices
 My Little Pony: Equestria Girls – Pinkie Pie, Fluttershy
 Equestria Girls: Rainbow Rocks – Pinkie Pie, Fluttershy
 Equestria Girls: Friendship Games – Pinkie Pie, Fluttershy, Sweetie Drops
 Equestria Girls: Legend of Everfree – Pinkie Pie, Fluttershy, Sweetie Drops
 My Little Pony: The Movie – Pinkie Pie, Fluttershy
 My Little Pony: A New Generation – Pinkie Pie, Fluttershy
 My Little Pony: Best Gift Ever – Pinkie Pie, Fluttershy, Minty Bubblegum
 My Little Pony: Rainbow Roadtrip – Pinkie Pie, Fluttershy
 My Little Pony: Pony Life – Pinkie Pie, Fluttershy, Buttershy, Alt-Pony 3
 Roary the Racing Car – Additional Voices
 Underground Ernie – Millie, Additional Voices (US Dub)
 Super Monsters – Katya
 The Little Prince – Myriad (The Planet of Libris)
 The Non-Adventures of Safety Queen – Safety Queen
 Pac-Man and the Ghostly Adventures – Cylindria
 Pocket Dragon Adventures – Additional Voices
 Rainbow Fish – Penny (Ep “Rainbow’s Pen Pal”), additional voices
 Random! Cartoons – Yumi
 ReBoot – young AndrAIa
 Rev & Roll – Avery, Jen
 Sabrina: The Animated Series – Norma
 Santa's Christmas Crash – Julie
 Salty's Lighthouse – Claude
 Sleeping Beauty – Misc
 Snow White – Apple Vendor
 Sonic Underground
 Stanley – Teresa Kirby
 Strawberry Shortcake's Berry Bitty Adventures – Lemon Meringue, Princess Berrykin, Sweet Grapes
 Strawberry Shortcake: Berry In The Big City – Lemon Meringue, Lemon Drop, Berry Mary
 Superbook – Barbara, Cell Phone Voice
 The Nutcracker – Marie
 Ultimate Book of Spells
 Vor-Tech: Undercover Conversion Squad – M.J. Sloan
 What About Mimi? – Additional Voices
 X-Men: Evolution – X-23 
 Yakkity Yak – Lemony
 3-2-1 Penguins! – Fuzzy (Ep “Promises, Promises”)
 Ninjago - Nyad

Anime roles
 Dragon Ball (BLT Productions English dub) – Chi-Chi, Penny (first movie)
 Elemental Gelade – Orega
 Gundam 00 – Mileina Vashti
 Kishin Corps: Alien Defender Geo-Armor – Cookie
 Maison Ikkoku – Ikuko Otonashi (Eps. 1–36)
 Mega Man: Upon a Star – Roll
 Night Warriors: Darkstalkers' Revenge – Anita

Other
  X-Play – Kanaren King

Video games
 Dragalia Lost – Serena
 Dragon Tales: Dragon Sneak – Emmy
 My Little Pony: Friendship Is Magic – Fluttershy, Pinkie Pie
 Tomodachi Life – Emily

References

External links
 
 

1984 births
Living people
Actresses from Toronto
Actresses from Vancouver
Canadian child actresses
Canadian film actresses
Canadian television actresses
Canadian video game actresses
Canadian voice actresses
20th-century Canadian actresses
21st-century Canadian actresses